Traugott Lawler (born 8 March 1937) is a medievalist scholar, expert on William Langland, and an emeritus professor of English at Yale University, where he served as master of Ezra Stiles College and also as a lecturer in religion and literature.

Lawler graduated from Regis High School in 1954, and then attended the College of the Holy Cross, graduating with a B.A. in 1958, and the University of Wisconsin–Madison (M.A. 1962). He obtained his doctorate at Harvard University.

In 1983, Lawler was named a Guggenheim Fellow. From 1986 to 1995, and from 2002 to 2003 he served as Master of Ezra Stiles College. He retired from teaching in 2005 to prepare, with other scholars, a commentary on the known versions of Piers Plowman. The book was released by University of Pennsylvania Press.

Under Lawler's leadership, Ezra Stiles College at Yale University had remarkable intramural success. During his first tenure as Master, Stiles won the Tyng Cup in six out of eight years. During his second term of service as Master, Ezra Stiles again won the Tyng Cup and continued to win in two subsequent years under the guidance of Stuart Schwartz.

Traugott is the younger brother of environmental engineer John P. Lawler, founder of Lawler, Matusky, & Skelly Engineers, which was later acquired by HDR, Inc.

Traugott is the great-uncle of Mike Lawler, a Republican Member of Congress. 

He has four children, Peter, Dan, Kate, and Greg with wife Margaret (Peggy) Lawler and eight grandchildren.

Notes

Works
Traugott Lawler, ed. and trans., John of Garland's Parisiana poetria de arte prosaica, metrica, et rithmica (Cambridge, Mass.: Ph.D. thesis, Harvard University, 1966).
Traugott Lawler, The One and the Many in the Canterbury Tales (Hamden, Conn.: Archon Books, 1980).
Traugott Lawler, ed. and trans., The Parisiana Poetria of John of Garland, Yale Studies in English 182 (New Haven: Yale University Press, 1974).
Traugott Lawler, ed., "Boece," in The Riverside Chaucer (Houghton Mifflin Company, 1987).
Traugott Lawler, "The Pardon Formula in Piers Plowman: Its Ubiquity, Its Binary Shape, Its Silent Middle Term," The Yearbook of Langland Studies ( YLS ), volume 14, (2000)
Traugott Lawler, "The Secular Clergy in Piers Plowman", with Míċeál F. Vaughan, "Response", The Yearbook of Langland Studies ( YLS ),  volume 16, (2003)
Traugott Lawler, ed. and trans., Parisiana poetria, Dumbarton Oaks Meideval Library 65 (Cambridge, Mass.: Harvard University Press, 2020).

External links
 Traugott Lawler Papers (MS 2023). Manuscripts and Archives, Yale University Library.

1937 births
Living people
American medievalists
University of Wisconsin–Madison alumni
Harvard University alumni
College of the Holy Cross alumni
Yale University faculty